Don Irvine (born September 26, 1954 in Calgary, Alberta) is a Canadian sprint canoer who competed in the mid-1980s. He finished ninth in the K-4 1000 m event at the 1984 Summer Olympics in Los Angeles.

References
Sports-Reference.com profile

1954 births
Canadian male canoeists
Canoeists at the 1984 Summer Olympics
Living people
Olympic canoeists of Canada
Sportspeople from Calgary
20th-century Canadian people